Błędów and similar may mean:

Places in Poland
Błędów, Szczecin
Błędów, Łódź Voivodeship (central Poland)
Błędów, Grójec County in Masovian Voivodeship (east-central Poland)
Błędów, Radom County in Masovian Voivodeship (east-central Poland)

People
Ludwig Bledow (27 July 1795, Berlin – 6 August 1846), was a German chess master and chess organizer (co-founder of the Berlin Pleiades)